André Henrique Justino (born 8 October 1982), commonly known as Deo, is a Brazilian futsal player who plays for MFC Aktobe as a winger.

Honours
UEFA Futsal Champions League: 2018–19
8*Campeonato Nacional da I Divisão de Futsal : 2003-04, 2005–06, 2009-10, 2010–11, 2012–13, 2013–14, 2016-17, 2017-18

External links
Sporting CP profile
FPF club profile

1982 births
Living people
Brazilian men's futsal players
Sporting CP futsal players
People from João Pessoa, Paraíba
Sportspeople from Paraíba